William Hardcastle may refer to:

Bill Hardcastle (1874–1944), New Zealand and Australian national representative rugby union and rugby league player
William Hardcastle (broadcaster) (1918–1975), British journalist and radio news presenter
William Hardcastle (football chairman), see 1912–13 Huddersfield Town F.C. season